Arthur George (28 July 1866 – 2 May 1931) was a New Zealand cricketer. He played in one first-class match for Wellington in 1913/14.

See also
 List of Wellington representative cricketers

References

External links
 

1866 births
1931 deaths
New Zealand cricketers
Wellington cricketers